Gaushala Bazar is the second largest business center in the Mahottari district of Nepal. The animal market of the place is well known. Gaushala is a variation of Goshala, a Sanskrit word that means the house of Cow. There is a huge cattle pen named Gaushala containing more than one hundred cows. It is protected by the government of Nepal.

The cow is regarded as a sacred animal in Nepal. Hindus considers the cow as mother, and worship the cow as a form of Goddess. Killing cows is illegal in Nepal. Ram Lakhan Chaudhary was Ex-VDC chief of Gaushala Bazar.

Bazaars in Nepal
Buildings and structures in Mahottari District